In enzymology, precorrin-6A synthase (deacetylating) is an enzyme that catalyzes the chemical reaction

S-adenosyl-L-methionine + precorrin-5 + H2O  S-adenosyl-L-homocysteine + precorrin-6A + acetate

The 3 substrates of this enzyme are S-adenosyl methionine, precorrin 5, and H2O. Its 3 products are S-adenosylhomocysteine, precorrin 6A, and acetate.

This enzyme belongs to the family of transferases, specifically those transferring one-carbon group methyltransferases.  The systematic name of this enzyme class is S-adenosyl-L-methionine:precorrin-5 C1-methyltransferase (deacetylating). Other names in common use include precorrin-6X synthase (deacetylating), and CobF.  This enzyme is part of the biosynthetic pathway to cobalamin (vitamin B12) in aerobic bacteria.

See also
 Cobalamin biosynthesis

References

 
 

EC 2.1.1
Enzymes of unknown structure